The 2022 North Hertfordshire District Council election took place on 5 May 2022 to elect 18 of the 49 members of North Hertfordshire District Council in England. This was on the same day as other local elections around the country. The council remained under no overall control, with a Labour and Liberal Democrat coalition continuing to run the council. The leader of the council remained the Labour group leader, Elizabeth Dennis-Harburg, and the deputy leader of the council remained the Liberal Democrat group leader, Ruth Brown.

Results summary

Ward results
The results for each ward were as follows. Where the previous incumbent was standing for re-election they are marked with an asterisk(*).

Baldock Town

Codicote

Hitchin Bearton

Hitchin Highbury

Hitchin Oughton

Hitchin Priory

Hitchin Walsworth

Hitchwood, Offa & Hoo

Kimpton

 
 
 
 

 
John Bishop had previously held the Kimpton seat as a Conservative, but resigned from the party shortly before the 2022 election and stood as an independent candidate.

Knebworth

Letchworth East

 
 

 
This Letchworth East seat had been vacant since October 2021 following the resignation of the previous Labour councillor, Sue Ngwala.

Letchworth Grange

Letchworth South East

Letchworth South West

Letchworth Wilbury

Royston Heath

Royston Meridian

Royston Palace

References

North Hertfordshire
North Hertfordshire District Council elections
2020s in Hertfordshire